John H. McMorries (born January 27, 1886) was the first African American physician at Cleveland City Hospital (now known as MetroHealth System).

Early life 
John Howard McMorries was born in Macon, Mississippi January 27, 1886.

References 

1886 births
1978 deaths
African-American physicians
Physicians from Ohio
People from Macon, Mississippi
Healthcare in Cleveland
20th-century African-American people